The PSE Composite Index, commonly known previously as the PHISIX and currently as the PSEi, is a stock market index of the Philippine Stock Exchange consisting of 30 companies.

As the PSE's only broad-base index, it is frequently seen as an indicator of the general state of the Philippine business climate, although its reliability as an indicator of the state of the broader Philippine economy has been put into question.

The stock exchange regularly revises the list, at least twice a year. The PSE Composite Index is always composed of 30 stocks.

Requirements 
The stock exchange maintains the following requirements for a stock to be included in the PSEi:
 Minimum free float level of 20%.
 This was increased from 12% before 2018.
 A company must also meet the liquidity and capitalization criteria.

Formula 
The exchange uses the following formula to calculate for the index:

Where:

n = Total number of component companies (30)

 = Closing price of company i at day t

= Available shares of company i at day t

= Company free float level (0 to 1), where 1 means 100% free float.

b = Free float-adjusted market capitalization base

Annual returns 
The following table shows the annual development of the PSE Composite Index since 1980.

Current components 
These are current as of February 2022:

Previous components

Record values

See also

PSE All Shares Index, index of almost all shares traded in the PSE

References

External links
 Bloomberg page for PCOMP:IND

Philippine stock market indices